In the Republic of India, a lieutenant governor is the constitutional head of five of the eight union territories. The lieutenant governor is appointed by the President of India for a term of five years, and holds office at the President's pleasure. Since the union territories of Delhi, Jammu and Kashmir and Puducherry have a measure of self-government with an elected legislature and council of ministers, the role of the lieutenant governor there is mostly a ceremonial one, akin to that of a state's governor. In Andaman and Nicobar Islands and Ladakh however, the lieutenant governor holds more power, being both the head of state and head of government.

The other three union territories—Chandigarh; Dadra and Nagar Haveli and Daman and Diu; and Lakshadweep—are governed by an administrator. Unlike the lieutenant governors of other territories, they are usually drawn from the Indian Administrative Service (IAS) or Indian Police Service (IPS). Since 1985 the Governor of Punjab has also been the ex-officio Administrator of Chandigarh.

Praful Khoda Patel, till date, is the only administrator of Dadra and Nagar Haveli and Daman and Diu who is not a civil servant (i.e. IAS or IPS), rather a politician. He was also given the additional charge of Lakshadweep after the death of Dineshwar Sharma.

Current Indian lieutenant governors

Current Indian administrators

See also
List of current Indian governors
List of female governors and lieutenant governors in India
List of vice presidents of India

References

G
G